The Kur River may refer to:

Kur (Kursk Oblast), in the Dnieper basin, Russia
Kur (Khabarovsk Krai), in the Amur basin, Russia
Kura (Russia), in Stavropol Krai, Russia
Kura (Caspian Sea) in Georgia and Azerbaijan (Georgian: მტკვარი - Mtkvari, Azerbaijani: Kür)

See also
 Kur (disambiguation)
Kor River in Iran